Ohno Bakufu (Japanese: 大野麦風, 1888–1976) was a Japanese painter and printmaker.

He was born in Tokyo, Japan. Over his lifetime he created over seventy designs. His best known piece is the Japanese Fish Picture Collection (Dai Nihon gyorui gashu). Although this is his most famous piece of work, he also created many landscapes and a few still lives. After 1923 Great Kantō earthquake, he moved to Kansai. He was an honorary member of the Hyogo Prefecture Academy of Fine Arts, and a member of Taiheiyogakai.

1976 deaths
1888 births
20th-century Japanese painters